

Roster

Schedule and Results

Standings

References 

North Carolina
North Carolina Tar Heels women's basketball seasons
North Carolina
North Car
North Car